Tarussky District is an administrative and municipal district (raion), one of the twenty-four in Kaluga Oblast, Russia. It is located in the east of the oblast. Its administrative center is the town of Tarusa. Population:  15,680 (2002 Census);  The population of Tarusa accounts for 59.7% of the district's total population.

References

Notes

Sources

Districts of Kaluga Oblast